Yohann Vivalda (born 8 December 1988) is a French rugby union player. His position is Flanker and he currently plays for USA Perpignan in the Top 14.

References

1988 births
Living people
French rugby union players
Sportspeople from Agen
USA Perpignan players
Rugby union flankers